This is a list of seasons completed by the New Mexico Lobos men's college basketball team.

Seasons

References

 
New Mexico Lobos
New Mexico Lobos basketball seasons